Məlikli (also, Melikli and Myalikli) is a village in the Yardymli Rayon of Azerbaijan.  The village forms part of the municipality of Tahirli.

References 

Populated places in Yardimli District